Baretti may refer to:

People
Christian Baretti (born 1973), German politician
Giuseppe Marc'Antonio Baretti (1719–1789), Italian literary critic, poet, and writer

Other
Il Baretti, Italian literary magazine
Punta Baretti, mountain in the Mont Blanc Massif in the Val d'Aosta, Italy